Ivan Edward Sutherland (born May 16, 1938) is an American computer scientist and Internet pioneer, widely regarded as a pioneer of computer graphics. His early work in computer graphics as well as his teaching with David C. Evans in that subject at the University of Utah in the 1970s was pioneering in the field. Sutherland, Evans, and their students from that era developed several foundations of modern computer graphics. He received the Turing Award from the Association for Computing Machinery in 1988 for the invention of the Sketchpad, an early predecessor to the sort of graphical user interface that has become ubiquitous in personal computers. He is a member of the National Academy of Engineering, as well as the National Academy of Sciences among many other major awards. In 2012, he was awarded the Kyoto Prize in Advanced Technology for "pioneering achievements in the development of computer graphics and interactive interfaces".

Biography
Sutherland's father was from New Zealand; his mother, Anne Sutherland, was from Scotland. His family moved to Wilmette, Illinois, then Scarsdale, New York, for his father's career. Bert Sutherland was his elder brother. Ivan Sutherland earned his bachelor's degree in electrical engineering from the Carnegie Institute of Technology, his master's degree from Caltech, and his Ph.D. from MIT in Electrical Engineering in 1963.

Sutherland invented Sketchpad in 1962 while at MIT. Claude Shannon signed on to supervise Sutherland's computer drawing thesis. Among others on his thesis committee were Marvin Minsky and Steven Coons. Sketchpad was an innovative program that influenced alternative forms of interaction with computers. Sketchpad could accept constraints and specified relationships among segments and arcs, including the diameter of arcs. It could draw both horizontal and vertical lines and combine them into figures and shapes. Figures could be copied, moved, rotated, or resized, retaining their basic properties. Sketchpad also had the first window-drawing program and clipping algorithm, which allowed zooming. Sketchpad ran on the Lincoln TX-2 computer and influenced Douglas Engelbart's oN-Line System. Sketchpad, in turn, was influenced by the conceptual Memex as envisioned by Vannevar Bush in his influential paper "As We May Think".

Sutherland replaced J. C. R. Licklider as the head of the US Defense Department Advanced Research Project Agency's  Information Processing Techniques Office (IPTO), when Licklider took a job at IBM in 1964.

From 1965 to 1968, Sutherland was an associate professor of electrical engineering at Harvard University. Work with student Danny Cohen in 1967 led to the development of the Cohen–Sutherland computer graphics line clipping algorithm. In 1968, with his students Bob Sproull, Quintin Foster, Danny Cohen, and others he created the first head-mounted display that rendered images for the viewer's changing pose, as sensed by The Sword of Damocles, thus making the first virtual reality system. A prior system, Sensorama, used a head-mounted display to play back static video and other sensory stimuli. The optical see-through head-mounted display used in Sutherland's VR system was a stock item used by U.S. military helicopter pilots to view video from cameras mounted on the helicopter's belly.

From 1968 to 1974, Sutherland was a professor at the University of Utah.  Among his students there were Alan Kay, inventor of the Smalltalk language, Gordon W. Romney (computer and cybersecurity scientist), who rendered the first 3D images at U of U, Henri Gouraud, who devised the Gouraud shading technique, Frank Crow, who went on to develop antialiasing methods, Jim Clark, founder of Silicon Graphics, Henry Fuchs, and Edwin Catmull, co-founder of Pixar and now president of Walt Disney and Pixar Animation Studios.

In 1968 he co-founded Evans & Sutherland with his friend and colleague David C. Evans.  The company did pioneering work in the field of real-time hardware, accelerated 3D computer graphics, and printer languages.
Former employees of Evans & Sutherland included the future founders of Adobe (John Warnock) and Silicon Graphics (Jim Clark).

From 1974 to 1978 he was the Fletcher Jones Professor of Computer Science at California Institute of Technology, where he was the founding head of that school's computer science department.  He then founded a consulting firm, Sutherland, Sproull and Associates, which was purchased by Sun Microsystems to form the seed of its research division, Sun Labs.

Sutherland was a fellow and vice president at Sun Microsystems.  Sutherland was a visiting scholar in the computer science division at University of California, Berkeley (fall 2005 – spring 2008).  On May 28, 2006,  Ivan Sutherland married Marly Roncken.  Sutherland and Marly Roncken are leading the research in Asynchronous Systems at Portland State University.

He has two children. His elder brother, Bert Sutherland, was also a computer science researcher.

Awards
 Computer History Museum Fellow "for the Sketchpad computer-aided design system and for lifelong contributions to computer graphics and education," 2005
 R&D 100 Award, 2004 (team)
 IEEE John von Neumann Medal, 1998
 Association for Computing Machinery Fellow, 1994
 Electronic Frontier Foundation EFF Pioneer Award, 1994
 ACM Software System Award, 1993
 Turing Award, 1988
 Computerworld Honors Program, Leadership Award, 1987

 Member, United States National Academy of Sciences, 1978
 National Academy of Engineering member
1973 "for creative contributions in computer science and computer graphics, particularly in the study of the interfaces between men and machines"
 Kyoto Prize 2012, in the category of advanced technology.
 National Inventors Hall of Fame Inductee, 2016.
 Washington Award, 2018 
 BBVA Fronteras del conocimiento 2019.

Quotes
 "A display connected to a digital computer gives us a chance to gain familiarity with concepts not realizable in the physical world.  It is a looking glass into a mathematical wonderland."
 "The ultimate display would, of course, be a room within which the computer can control the existence of matter. A chair displayed in such a room would be good enough to sit in. Handcuffs displayed in such a room would be confining, and a bullet displayed in such a room would be fatal."
 When asked: "How could you possibly have done the first interactive graphics program, the first non-procedural programming language, the first object oriented software system, all in one year?", Sutherland replied: "Well, I didn't know it was hard."
 "It’s not an idea until you write it down."
 "Without the fun, none of us would go on!"

Patents

Sutherland has more than 60 patents, including:
 US Patent 7,636,361 (2009) Apparatus and method for high-throughput asynchronous communication with flow control
 US Patent 7,417,993 (2008) Apparatus and method for high-throughput asynchronous communication
 US Patent 7,384,804 (2008) Method and apparatus for electronically aligning capacitively coupled mini-bars
 US patent 3,889,107 (1975)  System of polygon sorting by dissection
 US patent 3,816,726 (1974) Computer Graphics Clipping System for Polygons
 US patent 3,732,557 (1973) Incremental Position-Indicating System
 US patent 3,684,876 (1972) Vector Computing System as for use in a Matrix Computer
 US patent 3,639,736 (1972) Display Windowing by Clipping

Publications
 SketchPad, 2004 from "CAD software – history of CAD CAM" by CADAZZ
Sutherland's 1963 Ph.D. Thesis from Massachusetts Institute of Technology republished in 2003 by University of Cambridge as Technical Report Number 574, Sketchpad, A Man-Machine Graphical Communication System.  His thesis supervisor was Claude Shannon, father of information theory.
Duchess Chips for Process-Specific Wire Capacitance Characterization, The, by Jon Lexau, Jonathan Gainsley, Ann Coulthard and Ivan E. Sutherland, Sun Microsystems Laboratories Report Number TR-2001-100, October 2001
Technology And Courage by Ivan Sutherland, Sun Microsystems Laboratories Perspectives Essay Series, Perspectives-96-1 (April 1996)

Counterflow Pipeline Processor Architecture, by Ivan E. Sutherland, Charles E. Molnar (Charles Molnar), and Robert F. Sproull (Bob Sproull), Sun Microsystems Laboratories Report Number TR-94-25, April 1994
Oral history interview with Ivan Sutherland at Charles Babbage Institute, University of Minnesota, Minneapolis.  Sutherland describes his tenure as head of the Information Processing Techniques Office (IPTO) from 1963 to 1965. He discusses the existing programs as established by J. C. R. Licklider and the new initiatives started while he was there: projects in graphics and networking, the ILLIAC IV, and the Macromodule program.

See also
 List of pioneers in computer science

References

External links
 

American computer scientists
American software engineers
1938 births
Living people
Computer graphics professionals
Computer graphics researchers
Internet pioneers
Virtual reality pioneers
Engineers from California
Scientists from California
Fellows of the Association for Computing Machinery
Members of the United States National Academy of Engineering
Members of the United States National Academy of Sciences
Sun Microsystems people
Turing Award laureates
California Institute of Technology faculty
Harvard University faculty
University of Utah faculty
California Institute of Technology alumni
Carnegie Mellon University College of Engineering alumni
Scarsdale High School alumni
People from Hastings, Nebraska
People from Scarsdale, New York
20th-century American engineers
21st-century American engineers
20th-century American scientists
21st-century American scientists
Scientists from New York (state)
American people of Scottish descent
Engineers from New York (state)
Engineers from Nebraska
American people of New Zealand descent
UC Berkeley College of Engineering faculty
Kyoto laureates in Advanced Technology
Inventors from Nebraska